The 2012–13 Detroit Titans men's basketball team represented the University of Detroit Mercy in the 2012–13 NCAA Division I men's basketball season. Their head coach was Ray McCallum. The Titans played their home games at Calihan Hall and were members of the Horizon League. They finished the season 20–13, 12–4 in Horizon League play to finish in second place. They lost in the semifinals of the Horizon League tournament to Wright State. They received an invitation to the 2013 NIT where they lost in the first round to Arizona State.

Roster

Schedule

|-
!colspan=9| Exhibition

|-
!colspan=9| Regular season

 
|-
!colspan=12|2013 Horizon League tournament

|-
!colspan=9| 2013 NIT

References

Detroit Titans
Detroit Mercy Titans men's basketball seasons
Detroit
Detroit Titans men's b
Detroit Titans men's b